Bacchus Marsh railway station is located on the Serviceton line in Victoria, Australia. It serves the town of Maddingley, and it opened on 10 February 1887.

A number of sidings once existed opposite the station and were used to stable trains. It also has an operational  turntable, that is mainly used for turning steam locomotives on special trains.

History

Bacchus Marsh opened on 10 February 1887 as a temporary terminus of the line from Melbourne. On 4 December 1889, the line was extended to Ballan, which completed the direct Melbourne to Ballarat line. Like the town itself, the station was named after an early settler, Captain Bacchus.

The contract for the construction of the station building was awarded in 1889, for £1809/8/11. A 45 lever interlocking frame, in a signal box, was brought into use in 1890. By this time, the station had a main platform, with a dock platform at the eastern end, a main line and crossing loop, turntable, and a number of sidings. The station was originally provided with a  turntable. In 1957, it was replaced by a 70-foot unit.

In the late 1940s, brown coal, mined at nearby Maddingley, began to be transported in large quantities by rail, with dedicated trains operating between Bacchus Marsh and the APM Siding, in the Melbourne suburb of Fairfield. The coal was used to fire the boilers at the Australian Paper Manufacturers paper mill, with 400 tonnes of coal per day transferred in two trains per day. This traffic continued until the late 1970s, when the boilers were converted to natural gas firing.

Control of trains on the single track railway was controlled with the Electric Staff system until 1967, when the Automatic and Track Control (ATC) system was provided. At the same time, boom barriers replaced hand gates at the Parwan Road level crossing, located nearby in the Down direction, and remote control of the signals at Bank Box Loop was provided, with the same being done to the track towards Parwan Loop in 1987. Also during 1987, a number of changes to the station layout occurred, including the removal of a number of points, signals and their relevant posts, and the sleeving of a number of levers. In 1990, control of the signals at Rockbank were moved into the signal box. In 1993, No. 3 road was abolished, and in 1994, No. 3A road was abolished.

As part of the Regional Fast Rail project in 2005, the control of signals was relocated to Ballarat, and the platform was extended eastwards, in order to increase the speed of trains passing through the curve at the western end of the station. In addition, the curves over the Parwan Creek valley were realigned for higher speeds. In 2008, 160 additional car parks were provided at the station, for the use of rail commuters.

At the 2016/2017 Victorian State Budget, money was allocated for an additional platform and crossing loop, and to relocate the stabling facilities to nearby Rowsley. This was part of the larger $518 million Regional Rail Revival project along the Ballarat line, which included the duplication of the line between Deer Park West and Melton and between Warrenheip and Ballarat East, additional crossing loops at Ballan (which included an extra platform) and Bungaree, and stabling facilities at Maddingley. By February 2021, works along the line were completed, when new services were introduced.

Demolished station Parwan was located between Bacchus Marsh and Melton, while demolished stations Rowsley and Ingliston were located between Bacchus Marsh and Ballan.

Platforms and services

Bacchus Marsh has two side platforms. It is serviced by V/Line Ballarat and Ararat line services. During the peak-hour periods, a number of services begin and terminate at the station.

Platform 1:
  services to Southern Cross
  services to Southern Cross

Platform 2:
  services to Wendouree
  services to Ararat

Transport links

Bacchus Marsh Coaches operates three routes via Bacchus Marsh station, under contract to Public Transport Victoria:
 : Bacchus Marsh – Hillview Estate (Maddingley)
 : to Telford Park (Darley)
 : to Darley

Gallery

References

External links & further reading
 Newsrail September 1984 pp. 260–263
 Victorian Railway Stations gallery
 Melway map at street-directory.com.au

Railway stations in Australia opened in 1887
Regional railway stations in Victoria (Australia)
Bacchus Marsh